Guillaume Rippert (born 30 April 1985, in Paris) is a French former footballer who played as a defender.

Career 
In 2006 Rippert was loaned by FC Nantes to Valenciennes. He made his professional debut in Ligue 2 on 5 August 2006. He went on to play 21 games in his first season, as Valenciennes won promotion and the league title. At the end of his loan spell he elected to stay with Valenciennes rather than return to Nantes. After two season in Ligue 1, and with competition for his place, he agreed a termination of his contract and signed for fellow Ligue 1 side FC Metz.

He was released by Metz after one season in Ligue 1, and joined Greek side AO Kavala, who were newly promoted to Super League Greece. However, an issue arose with the validity of his three-year contract, and he returned to France.

In September 2009 he signed for Evian to play in Championnat National. He helped the club win back to back titles and promotions and played another season in Ligue 1. For the 2012–13 season, Rippert, along with fellow Evian player Nicolas Farina was loaned to German 2. Bundesliga side FC Energie Cottbus.

After a year in Germany Rippert returned to France with Ligue 2 Stade Lavallois. He then moved to Switzerland, signing for Swiss Challenge League side FC Lausanne-Sport. However, when manager Marco Simone was sacked, the new manager dispensed with the nine French players. Rippert signed for Romanian Liga I side FC Petrolul Ploiești, but he left due to issues with payment of wages.

In January 2016, Rippert and Farina joined up again, at SO Cholet in Championnat de France Amateur, where he won promotion.

Honours
Valenciennes
Ligue 2: 2005–06
Evian
Ligue 2: 2010–11
Championnat National: 2009–10

References

External links

1985 births
Living people
French footballers
Ligue 1 players
FC Nantes players
Valenciennes FC players
FC Metz players
Thonon Evian Grand Genève F.C. players
FC Energie Cottbus players
Stade Lavallois players
FC Lausanne-Sport players
FC Petrolul Ploiești players
SO Cholet players
Ligue 2 players
Championnat National players
2. Bundesliga players
Swiss Challenge League players
Liga I players
Footballers from Paris
France under-21 international footballers
France youth international footballers
French expatriate footballers
Expatriate footballers in Romania
Expatriate footballers in Germany
Expatriate footballers in Switzerland
Association football defenders
French expatriate sportspeople in Romania
French expatriate sportspeople in Germany
French expatriate sportspeople in Switzerland